Armin Mordekhai Schreiner (25 February 187429 November 1941) was influential Croatian industrialist, banker, Jewish activist and member of the first Freemasonry Jewish Lodge Zagreb No. 1090 independent order of B'nai B'rith.

Schreiner was born on 25 February 1874 to Yaakov and Khana Schreiner. He was Jewish, considered himself non-Zionists and was married to Roza Schreiner. He and his wife had six children; daughters Mira (b. 1915) and Ella (b. 1902), and sons; Leo (now Arie Aharoni, b. 1913), Ferdinand (b. 1901), Hadumi (b. 1908), Vladimir (b. 1909), and Otto (b. 1912). He was the owner of multiple factories, among them brick factory "Zagorka" (now "Tondach Hrvatska") in Bedekovčina. He was also the vice president of "Gradska štedionica" (now "Zagrebačka banka") and vice president of the "Industrialists Union".

Schreiner's family suffered terrible devastation during the Holocaust. Schreiner was killed at the Jasenovac concentration camp in 1941. His wife and daughter were killed in August 1941, at the Pag concentration camp. His son Vladimir was killed in 1941 at Jadovno concentration camp, son Otto in 1941 at Thessaloniki, and son Ferdinand, with his 7-year-old daughter Helga, in 1942 at the Auschwitz concentration camp. Schreiner son Arie was the only one who survived the Holocaust.

References

Bibliography

 
 
 

1874 births
1941 deaths
People from Koprivnica
Croatian Jews who died in the Holocaust
Austro-Hungarian Jews
Croatian Austro-Hungarians
Croatian bankers
Croatian businesspeople
Croatian Freemasons
Croatian civilians killed in World War II
People who died in Jasenovac concentration camp
Croatian people executed in Nazi concentration camps
Jewish anti-Zionism